Vairavarpuliyankulam (Official Name 214D), (Tamil: வைரவர்புளியங்குளம், romanized: Vairavarpuḷiyaṅkuḷam; Sinhala: වයිරවර්පුලියන්කුලම්, romanized: Vayiravarpuliyankulam) is a suburb of Vavuniya in Sri Lanka.  All government buildings for the Vavuniya district are located there. This is one of the place in Vavuniya, where Rich and educated people lives. Most of them are originally from Jaffna, came after massive displacement in 1996. Prices of the Land is so High and Living in Vairavarpuliyankulam is matter of Pride.

Etymology 
The area was a major tamarind forest, or 'puliyam' in Tamil. The people who lived in Vairavarpuliyankulam built a Hindu temple for the Shaivite deity, Vairavar, giving the village its name.

Geography
Vairavarpuliyankulam is bordered to the north by Kurumankadu, to the east and south by Katkuly, and to the west by Pandarikulam.

Education 
Popular schools or other educational services in Vavuniya district are located in or close to the city.

Transportation 
Vavuniya Railway Station and Vavuniya Bus Stand are located there.

Medical 
Vavuniya General Hospital is located there.

References 

Populated places in Vavuniya District